Khuli Khidki is a 1989 Bollywood film directed by P. Chandrakumar and starring Shafeeq, Neeta Puri, Abhilasha, Gajendra Chauhan, Aruna Irani, Amjad Khan, Disco Shanti and Tiku Talsania.

Plot

Khuli Khidki tells the story of a man and his masculine instincts that brings atomy changes in him after his love relationship.

Cast

Neeta Puri
Shafeeq
Satyan Kappu
Tiku Talsania
Gajendra Chauhan
Aruna Irani
Disco Shanti
Abhilasha
Jaya Mala
Amjad Khan

Soundtrack
"Chalo Chalen" - Anuradha Paudwal, Vinod Rathore
"Sonia Mera Naam Hai" - Anuradha Paudwal
"Door Door Kyun Hai" - Anuradha Paudwal
"Palat Palat Palat" - Udit Narayan, Sarika Kapoor

References

External links
 

1980s Hindi-language films
1989 films
Films directed by P. Chandrakumar